Chris Alberghini (born September 27, 1965 in Plymouth, Massachusetts) is an American television director and producer. Alberghini has worked on many shows, including The Nanny, Murphy Brown, Tori Spelling's VH1 sitcom, So NoTORIous, Reba, 90210 and many others. With Mike Chessler, he was showrunner and Executive Producer of Seasons 4 and 5 of MTV’s hit comedy Awkward as well as VH1’s scripted comedic drama Daytime Divas starring Vanessa Williams. With Tori Spelling and Jennie Garth, he co-created Fox’s critically acclaimed Beverly Hills, 90210 reboot BH90210, Fox’s highest rated summer series of 2019. With Mike Chessler, he also served as showrunner and Executive Producer.

External links

Living people
American television directors
Television producers from Massachusetts
People from Plymouth, Massachusetts
1965 births